The 2021 Fordham Rams football team represented Fordham University in the 2021 NCAA Division I FCS football season. They were led by fourth-year head coach Joe Conlin and played their home games at Coffey Field as a member of the Patriot League.

Schedule

References

Fordham
Fordham Rams football seasons
Fordham Rams football